New Hampshire State Prison for Men (NHSPM) is a New Hampshire Department of Corrections prison in New Hampshire, United States.  Located in Concord, New Hampshire, it is equipped to accept maximum, medium, and minimum security prisoners.

Opened in 1878 to replace an earlier prison built in 1812, State Prison for Men is the State of New Hampshire's oldest prison facility. Renovated and expanded in the 1980s, it includes a 60-bed secure psychiatric unit/residential treatment unit, and is the only facility operated by the New Hampshire Department of Corrections which houses maximum security male prisoners.

The New Hampshire Corrections Special School District operates a high school within this facility, which provides both a high school diploma or the G.E.D.

A full-time health services center including dental and long-term health care wing is operated within this facility and is capable of housing both male and female prisoners in need of long term, chronic, or terminal care.

Nineteen wardens have run this facility since it opened in 1878.

Classification Levels
The NH Prison for Men houses different levels of classification(C) for male prisoners. Minimum Security(C1), Low Security(C2), General Population (C3), Medium Security(C4), and Maximum Security(C5).
An Inmate is granted access to a bank account set up through the prison financial center. A maximum of $1,000 dollars can be deposited into a prisoner's account by verified family and friends. https://prisoninsight.com/correctional-facilities/state/new-hampshire/new-hampshire-state-prison-for-men/

Gallery

See also
 New Hampshire State Prison for Women

External links
 New Hampshire State Prison for Men

References

 https://prisoninsight.com/correctional-facilities/state/new-hampshire/new-hampshire-state-prison-for-men/

1878 establishments in New Hampshire
Prisons in New Hampshire
Buildings and structures in Concord, New Hampshire
Men's prisons
Men in the United States